Sisurcana citrochyta is a species of moth of the  family Tortricidae. It is found in Ecuador (Pastaza Province, Tungurahua Province and Napo Province).

References

Moths described in 1926
Sisurcana